Kill me may refer to:

Music

 "Kill Me", a 2012 song by The Pretty Reckless
 "Money"/"Kill Me", a 1995 double A-side single by Space
 Kill Me (EP), a 2020 extended play by Sundara Karma

Film 
 Kill Me (film), a 2009 South Korean film

See also
 Kill Me Baby, a Japanese four-panel manga
 Kill Me Later, a 2001 American crime thriller film
 Kill Me Tomorrow, a 1957 British crime film
 London Kills Me, a 1991 British comedy film